Modrová is a village and municipality in Nové Mesto nad Váhom District in the Trenčín Region of western Slovakia.

History
In historical records the village was first mentioned in 1348.

Geography
The municipality lies at an altitude of 204 metres and covers an area of 11.675 km2. It has a population of about 500 people.

References

External links

 Official page
http://www.statistics.sk/mosmis/eng/run.html

Villages and municipalities in Nové Mesto nad Váhom District